The Microscopic Septet is a jazz septet, founded in 1980 by saxophonist Phillip Johnston. They played frequently in New York City, toured, and recorded until they disbanded in 1992. Known affectionately as "The Micros" Heather Phares of Allmusic described them as "one of the most distinctive jazz ensembles in New York during the '80s and early '90s" due to their innovative updating of classic big band styles of the 1930s and '40s.

The band reformed for a few performances in 2006 in conjunction with the reissue of their first four albums, then long out of print, by Cuneiform Records. They performed again in the United States and Europe in December 2007, and have reunited for performances in New York City almost every year since, most recently at The Kitchen in Manhattan (12/9/17). Since reforming The Microscopic Septet have released four albums all on Cuneiform, most recently Been Up So Long It Looks Like Down To Me: The Micros Play The Blues.

They are known for performing the theme song for NPR's Fresh Air program, which was composed by pianist Joel Forrester.

Members

Discography

Take the Z Train (1983) Press Records
Let's Flip! (1985) Osmosis Records
Off Beat Glory (1986) Osmosis Records
Beauty Based on Science (1988) Stash Records
Seven Men in Neckties: The History of the Micros, Vol. 1 (2006) Cuneiform Records (includes Z Train and Let's Flip along with previously unreleased material)
Surrealistic Swing: The History of the Micros, Vol. 2 (2006) Cuneiform Records (includes Off Beat Glory and Beauty Based on Science along with previously unreleased material)
Lobster Leaps In (2008) Cuneiform Records
Friday the Thirteenth: The Micros Play Monk (2010) Cuneiform Records
Manhattan Moonrise (2014) Cuneiform Records
Been Up So Long It Looks Like Down To Me: The Micros Play The Blues (2017) Cuneiform Records

See also
List of experimental big bands

External links
Official website
Official MySpace site
https://www.kickstarter.com/projects/479371896/friday-the-13th-the-micros-play-monk-the-new-cd/description
https://www.kickstarter.com/projects/479371896/the-microscopic-septets-new-cd-manhattan-moonrise/description
https://www.kickstarter.com/projects/479371896/the-micros-play-the-blues/description

Notes and references

American jazz ensembles from New York City
Experimental big bands
Progressive big bands
Post-bop ensembles
Septets